Roland Corbineau (24 February 1928 – 7 May 1954) was a French Army officer who served during the First Indochina War. He was one of the last to die during the Battle of Dien Bien Phu.

Life and career
Corbineau was born in Loudun, Vienne department, the second child in a merchant family of four children. He was sent to school at Billom at age twelve and then Autun in 1944 before preparing for the entrance exam at Saint Cyr Military Academy at the Prytanée National Militaire in class Cyr IV, from 1946 to 1947. He was integrated in promotion Rhine et Danube 1947–1949, after graduating from Saint Cyr he choose to serve in the infantry. He was sent to the applied infantry school, after graduating from there he chose the airborne troops and was assigned to the 18th Choc Parachute Battalion (18e BPC) in 1950.

Lieutenant Corbineau was designated for service in Indochina and in July 1952 he joined the 6th Colonial Parachute Battalion (6e BPC) under Major Marcel Bigeard. With the battalion he took part in several operations in northern Vietnam. In March 1954 he jumped with the battalion to reinforce the Dien Bien Phu garrison. He was killed at his post, Eliane 1, on 7 May 1954, the last day of the Battle of Dien Bien Phu. He was chosen as the patron of the 2008-2010 promotion of the Corniche Brutionne.

1928 births
1954 deaths
People from Vienne
French Army officers
French military personnel of the First Indochina War
French military personnel killed in the First Indochina War
École Spéciale Militaire de Saint-Cyr alumni